Menelik II (horse name Abba Dagnew (Amharic: አባ ዳኘው abba daññäw); 17 August 1844 – 12 December 1913), baptised as Sahle Maryam (ሣህለ ማርያም sahlä maryam) was King of Shewa from 1866 to 1889 and Emperor of Ethiopia from 1889 to his death in 1913. At the height of his internal power and external prestige, the process of territorial expansion and creation of the modern empire-state was completed by 1898. 

The Ethiopian Empire was transformed under Emperor Menelik: the major signposts of modernisation were put in place, with the assistance of key ministerial advisors. Externally, Menelik led Ethiopian troops against Italian invaders in the First Italo-Ethiopian War; following a decisive victory at the Battle of Adwa, recognition of Ethiopia's independence by external powers was expressed in terms of diplomatic representation at his court and delineation of Ethiopia's boundaries with the adjacent kingdoms. Menelik expanded his realm to the south and east, into Oromo, Kaffa, Sidama, Wolayta and other kingdoms or peoples.

Later in his reign, Menelik established the first Cabinet of Ministers to help in the administration of the Empire, appointing trusted and widely respected nobles and retainers to the first Ministries. These ministers would remain in place long after his death, serving in their posts through the brief reign of Lij Iyasu (whom they helped depose) and into the reign of Empress Zewditu.

Early life 
Menelik was the son of the Shewan Amhara king, Negus Haile Melekot, and probably of the palace servant girl Ejigayehu Lemma Adyamo. He was born in Angolalla and baptized to the name Sahle Maryam. His father, at the age of 18 before inheriting the throne, impregnated Ejigayehu, then left her; he did not recognize that Sahle Maryam was born. The boy enjoyed a respected position in the royal household and he received a traditional church education.

In 1855 the Emperor of Ethiopia, Tewodros II, invaded the then semi-independent kingdom of Shewa. Early in the subsequent campaigns, Haile Malakot died, and Sahle Miriam was captured and taken to the emperor’s mountain stronghold, Amba Magdela. Still, Tewodros treated the young prince well, even offering him marriage to his daughter Altash Tewodros, which Menelik accepted.

Upon Menelik's imprisonment, his uncle, Haile Mikael, was appointed as Shum of Shewa by Emperor Tewodros II with the title of Meridazmach. However, Meridazmach Haile Mikael rebelled against Tewodros, resulting in his being replaced by the non-royal Ato Bezabeh as Shum. Ato Bezabeh in turn rebelled against the Emperor and proclaimed himself Negus of Shewa. Although the Shewan royals imprisoned at Magdela had been largely complacent as long as a member of their family ruled over Shewa, this usurpation by a commoner was not acceptable to them. They plotted Menelik's escape from Magdela; with the help of Mohammed Ali and Queen Worqitu of Wollo, he escaped from Magdala on the night of 1 July 1865, abandoning his wife, and returned to Shewa. Enraged, Emperor Tewodros slaughtered 29 Oromo hostages then had 12 Amhara notables beaten to death with bamboo rods.

King of Shewa

Bezabeh's attempt to raise an army against Menelik failed; thousands of Shewans rallied to the flag of the son of Negus Haile Melekot and even Bezabeh's own soldiers deserted him for the returning prince. Abeto Menelik entered Ankober and proclaimed himself Negus.

Grief over Tewodros 
While Negus Menelik reclaimed his ancestral Shewan crown, he also laid claim to the Imperial throne, as a direct descendant male line of Emperor Lebna Dengel. However, he made no overt attempt to assert this claim at this time; Marcus interprets his lack of decisive action not only to Menelik's lack of confidence and experience but that "he was emotionally incapable of helping to destroy the man who had treated him as a son." Not wishing to take part in the 1868 Expedition to Abyssinia, he allowed his rival Kassai to benefit with gifts of modern weapons and supplies from the British. When Tewodros committed suicide, Menelik arranged for an official celebration of his death even though he was personally saddened by the loss. When a British diplomat asked him why he did this, he replied "to satisfy the passions of the people ... as for me, I should have gone into a forest to weep over ... [his] untimely death ... I have now lost the one who educated me, and toward whom I had always cherished filial and sincere affection."

Afterwards other challenges – a revolt amongst the Wollo to the north, the intrigues of his second wife Befana to replace him with her choice of ruler, military failures against the Arsi Oromo to the southeast – kept Menelik from directly confronting Kassai until after his rival had brought an Abuna from Egypt who crowned him Emperor Yohannes IV.

Menelik was cunning and strategic in building his power base. He organised extravagant three-day feasts for locals to win their favour, liberally built friendships with Muslims (such as Muhammad Ali of Wollo) and struck alliances with the French and Italians who could provide firearms and political leverage against the Emperor. In 1876, an Italian expedition set out to Ethiopia led by Marchese Orazio Antinori who described King Menelik as "very friendly, and a fanatic for weapons, about whose mechanism he appears to be most intelligent". Another Italian wrote for Menelik, "he had the curiosity of a boy; the least thing made an impression upon him ... He showed ... great intelligence and great mechanical ability". Menelik spoke with great economy and rapidity. He never became upset, Chiarini adds, "listening calmly, judiciously [and] with good sense ... He is fatalistic and a good soldier, he loves weapons above all else". The visitors also confirmed that he was popular with his subjects, and made himself available to them. Menelik had political and military acumen and made key engagements that would later prove essential as he expanded his Empire.

Succession
On 10 March 1889, Emperor Yohannes IV was killed in a war with the Mahdist State during the Battle of Gallabat (Metemma). With his dying breath, Yohannes declared his natural son, Dejazemach Mengesha Yohannes, to be his heir. On 25 March, upon hearing of the death of Yohannes, Negus Menelik immediately proclaimed himself as Emperor.

Menelik argued that while the family of Yohannes IV claimed descent from King Solomon and the Queen of Sheba through females of the dynasty, his own claim was based on uninterrupted direct male lineage which made the claims of the House of Shewa equal to those of the elder Gondar line of the dynasty. Menelik, and later his daughter Zewditu, would be the last Ethiopian monarchs who could claim uninterrupted direct male descent from King Solomon and the Queen of Sheba (both Lij Iyasu and Emperor Haile Selassie were in the female line, Iyasu through his mother Shewarega Menelik, and Haile Selassie through his paternal grandmother, Tenagnework Sahle Selassie).

In the end, Menelik was able to obtain the allegiance of a large majority of the Ethiopian nobility. On 3 November 1889, Menelik was consecrated and crowned as Emperor before a glittering crowd of dignitaries and clergy by Abuna Mattewos, Bishop of Shewa, at the Church of Mary on Mount Entoto. The newly consecrated and crowned Emperor Menelik II quickly toured the north in force. He received the submission of the local officials in Lasta, Yejju, Gojjam, Wollo, and Begemder.

Conquest of neighboring states and defeat of the Italians

Invasions

Menelik II is argued to be the founder of modern Ethiopia. Before Menelik's colonial conquests, Ethiopia and Adal Sultanate had been devastated by numerous wars, the most recent of which was fought in the 16th century. In the intervening period, military tactics had not changed much. In the 16th century, the Portuguese Bermudes documented depopulation and widespread atrocities against civilians and combatants (including torture, mass killings and large scale slavery) during several successive Gadaa conquests led by Aba Gedas of territories located north of Genale river (Bali, Amhara, Gafat, Damot, Adal. Warfare in the region essentially involved acquiring cattle and slaves, winning additional territories, gaining control over trade routes and carrying out ritual requirements or securing trophies to prove masculinity.
Menelik’s clemency to Ras Mengesha Yohannes, whom he made hereditary Prince of his native Tigray, was ill repaid by a long series of revolts. In 1898, Menelik crushed a rebellion by Ras Mengesha Yohannes (who died in 1906). After this, Menelik directed his efforts to the consolidation of his authority, and to a degree, to the opening up of his country to outside influences. League of Nations in 1935 reported that after the invasion of Menelik's forces into non Abyssinian lands of Somalis, Harari, Oromo, Sidama, Shanqella etc., the inhabitants were enslaved and heavily taxed by the gebbar system leading to depopulation.

Menelik brought together many of the northern territories through political consensus. The exception was Gojjam, which offered tribute to the Shewan Kingdom following its defeat at the Battle of Embabo. Most of the western and central territories like Jimma, Welega Province and Chebo surrendered to Menelik's invading forces with no resistance. Native armed soldiers of Ras Gobana Dacche, Ras Mikael Ali, Habtegyorgis Dinegde, Balcha Aba Nefso and were allied to Menelik's Shewan army which campaigned to the south to incorporate more territories.

Beginning in the 1870s, Menelik set off from the central province of Shewa to reunify 'the lands and people of the South, East, and West into an empire. This period of expansions has been referred to by some as the 'Agar Maqnat' - roughly translating to some type of 'Cultivation' of land. The people incorporated by Menelik through conquest were the southerners – Oromo, Sidama, Gurage, Wolayta and other groups. Historian Raymond Jonas decribes the conquest of  the Emirate of Harar by Menelik as "brutal".

In territories incorporated peacefully like Jimma, Leka, and Wolega the former order was preserved and there was no interference in their self-government; in areas incorporated after war, the appointed new rulers did not violate the peoples' religious beliefs and they treated them lawfully and justly. However, in the territories incorporated by military conquest, Menelik's army carried out atrocities against civilians and combatants including torture, mass killings, and large scale slavery. Large scale atrocities were also committed against the Dizi people and the people of the Kaficho kingdom. Some estimates that the number of people killed as a result of the conquest from war, famine and atrocities go into the millions. Based on convergent subjugation approaches, cooperation between Menelik and Belgian king Leopold II were attempted more than once.

The British journalist Augustus B. Wylde wrote after meeting Menelik: "I had found him a man of great kindness, a remarkably shrewd and clever man and very well informed on most things except on England and her resources; his information on our country evidently having been obtained from persons entirely unfriendly to us; and who did not want Englishmen to have any diplomatic or commercial transactions whatever with Abyssinia [Ethiopia]". After meeting him, Lord Edward Gleichen wrote: "Menelik's manners are pleasant and dignified; he is courteous and kindly, and at the same time simple in manner, giving one the impression of a man who wishes to get at the root of a matter at once, without wasting time in compliments and beating about the bush, so often the characteristics of Oriental potentates...He also aims at being a popular sovereign, accessible to his people at all hours, and ready to listen to their complaints. In this, he appears to be quite successful, for one and all of his subjects seem to bear for him a real affection."

Foundation of Addis Ababa
For a period, Ethiopia lacked a permanent capital; instead, the royal encampment served as a roving capital. For a time Menelik's camp was on Mount Entoto, but in 1886, while Menelik was on campaign in Harar, Empress Taytu Betul camped at a hot spring to the south of Mount Entoto. She decided to build a house there and from 1887 this was her permanent base, which she named Addis Ababa (new flower). Menelik's Generals were all allocated land nearby to build their own houses, and in 1889 work began in a new royal palace. The city grew rapidly, and by 1910 the city had around 70,000 permanent inhabitants, with up to 50,000 more on a temporary basis. Only in 1917, after Menelik's death, was the city reached by the railway from Djibouti.

The Great Famine (1888–1892) 
During Menelik's reign, the great famine of 1888 to 1892, which was the worst famine in the region's history, killed a third of the total population which was then estimated at 12 million. The famine was caused by rinderpest, an infectious viral cattle disease which wiped out most of the national livestock, killing over 90% of the cattle. The native cattle population had no prior exposure and were unable to fight off the disease.

Wuchale Treaty

On 2 May 1889, while claiming the throne against Ras Mengesha Yohannes, the "natural son" of Emperor Yohannes IV, Menelik concluded a treaty with Italy at Wuchale (Uccialli in Italian) in Wollo province. On the signing of the treaty, Menelik said "The territories north of the Merab Milesh (i.e. Eritrea) do not belong to Abyssinia nor are under my rule. I am the Emperor of Abyssinia. The land referred to as Eritrea is not peopled by Abyssinians – they are Adals, Bejaa, and Tigres. Abyssinia will defend his territories but will not fight for foreign lands, which Eritrea is to my knowledge." Under the Treaty, Abyssinia and Kingdom of Italy agreed to define the boundary between Eritrea and Ethiopia. For example, both Ethiopia and Italy agreed that Arafali, Halai, Segeneiti and Asmara are villages within the Italian border. Also, the Italians agreed not to harass Ethiopian traders and to allow safe passage for Ethiopian goods, particularly military weapons. The treaty also guaranteed that the Ethiopian government would have ownership of the Monastery of Debre Bizen but not use it for military purposes.

However, there were two versions of the treaty, one in Italian and another in Amharic. Unknown to Menelik the Italian version gave Italy more power than the two had agreed to. The Italians believed they had "tricked" Menelik into giving allegiance to Italy. To their surprise, upon learning about the alteration, Emperor Menelik II rejected the treaty. The Italians attempted to bribe him with two million rounds of ammunition but he refused. Then the Italians approached Ras Mengesha of Tigray in an attempt to create civil war, however, Ras Mengesha, understanding that Ethiopia's independence was at stake, refused to be a puppet for the Italians. The Italians, therefore, prepared to attack Ethiopia with an army led by Baratieri. Subsequently, the Italians declared war and attempted to invade Ethiopia.

Italo-Ethiopian War

Menelik's disagreement with Article 17 of the treaty led to the Battle of Adwa. Before Italy could launch the invasion, Eritreans rebelled in an attempt to push Italy out of Eritrea and prevent its invasion of Ethiopia. The rebellion was not successful. However, some of the Eritreans managed to make their way to the Ethiopian camp and jointly fought Italy at the battle of Adwa.

On 17 September 1895, Menelik ordered all of the Ethiopian nobility to call out their banners and raise their feudal hosts, stating: "An enemy has come across the sea. He has broken through our frontiers in order to destroy our fatherland and our faith. I allowed him to seize my possessions and I entered upon lengthy negotiations with him in hopes of obtaining justice without bloodshed. But the enemy refuses to listen. He undermines our territories and our people like a mole. Enough! With the help of God I will defend the inheritance of my forefathers and drive back the invader by force of arms. Let every man who has sufficient strength accompany me. And he who has not, let him pray for us". Menelik's opponent, General Oreste Baratieri, underestimated the size of the Ethiopian force, predicating that Menelik could only field 30,000 men.

Despite the dismissive Italian claim that Ethiopia was a "barbaric" African nation whose men were no match for white troops, the Ethiopians were better armed, being equipped with thousands of modern French rifles and Hotchkiss artillery guns together with ammunition and shells which were superior to the Italian rifles and artillery. Menelik had ensured that his infantry and artillerymen were properly trained in their use, giving the Ethiopians a crucial advantage as the Hotchkiss artillery could fire more rapidly than the Italian artillery. In 1887 a British diplomat, Gerald Portal, wrote after seeing the Ethiopian feudal hosts parade before him, the Ethiopians were "...redeemed by the possession of unbounded courage, by a disregard of death, and by a national pride, which leads them to look down on every human being who has not had the good fortune to be born an Abyssinian [Ethiopian]". 

The Emperor personally led his army to attack an Italian force led by Major Toselli on 7 December 1895 at Boota Hill. The Ethiopians attacked a force of 350 Eritrean irregulars on the left flank, who collapsed under the Ethiopian assault, causing Toselli to send two companies of Italian infantry who halted the Ethiopian advance. Just as Toselli was rejoicing in his apparent victory, the main Ethiopian assault came down on his right flank, causing Toselli to order retreat. The Emperor's best general, Ras Makonnen, had occupied the road leading back to Eritrea, and launched a surprise attack, which routed the Italians. The battle of Amba Alagi ended with an Italian force of 2,150 men losing 1,000 men and 20 officers killed.

Ras Makonnen followed up that victory by defeating General Arimondi and forcing the Italians to retreat to the fort at Mekele. Ras Makonnen laid siege to the fort, and on the morning of 7 January 1896, the defenders of the fort spotted a huge red tent among the besiegers, showing that the emperor had arrived. On 8 January 1896, the emperor's elite Shoan infantry captured the fort's well, and then beat off desperate Italian attempts to retake the well. On 19 January 1896, the fort's commander, Major Galliano, whose men were dying of dehydration, raised the white flag of surrender. Major Galliano and his men were allowed to march out, surrender their arms and to go free. Menelik stated he allowed the Italians to go free as "to give proof of my Christian faith," saying his quarrel was with the Italian government of Prime Minister Francesco Crispi that was trying to conquer his nation, not the ordinary Italian soldiers who been conscripted against their will to fight in the war. Menelik's magnanimity to the defenders of Fort Mekele may have been an act of psychological warfare. Menelik knew from talking to French and Russian diplomats that the war and Crispi himself were unpopular in Italy, and one of the main points of Crispi's propaganda were allegations of atrocities against Italian POWs. From Menelik's viewpoint allowing the Italian POWs to go free and unharmed was the best way of rebutting this propaganda and undermining public support for Crispi.    

Crispi sent another 15,000 men to the Horn of Africa and ordered the main Italian commander, General Oreste Baratieri, to finish off the "barbarians". As Baratieri dithered, Menelik was forced to pull back on 17 February 1896 as his huge host was running out of food. After Crispi sent an insulting telegram accusing Baratieri of cowardice, on 28 February 1896 the Italians decided to seek battle with Menelik. On 1 March 1896, the two armies met at Adwa. The Ethiopians came out victorious.

With victory at the Battle of Adwa and the Italian colonial army destroyed, Eritrea was Emperor Menelik's for the taking but no order to occupy was given. It seems that Emperor Menelik II was wiser than the Europeans had given him credit for. Realising that the Italians would bring all their force to bear on his country if he attacked, he instead sought to restore the peace that had been broken by the Italians and their treaty manipulation seven years before. In signing the treaty, Menelik II again proved his adeptness at politics as he promised each nation something for what they gave and made sure each would benefit his country and not another nation. Subsequently, the Treaty of Addis Ababa was reached between the two nations. Italy was forced to recognise the absolute independence of Ethiopia, as described in Article III of the treaty.

Ethnic makeup of Menelik's government and forces
At the Battle of Adwa, Ethiopian fighters from all parts of the country rallied to the cause and took up positions on the battlefield that allowed them to come to each other's aid during combat. Armies divided over three flanks, the left wing coming from the direction of Maryam Sawito, Ras Mengesha Yohannes' and Ras Alula's Tigrayan army; Wag-shum Gwangul's Agaw and Amhara from Wag and Lasta; and Mikael's Wollo (Amhara) cavalry. Menelik II dispatched Negus Tekle Haymanot of Gojjam's Amhara infantry and cavalry to the right flank, in the direction of Abba Garima. His majesty front, in the center were spearheaded by Ras Makonnen Wolde Mikael's Harar army that included Amhara, Gurage and some Oromo soldiers; Ras Walle Bitul's Gondar army; The Fitawrari's army, normally the leader of the advanced guard, was commanded by Gebeyehu Gorra; Fitawrari Tekle's Wallaga Cavalry and infantry;  and next to Emperor Menelik II was the mehal sefari or central fighting unit included mostly Shewan Amhara, Mecha-Tulama Oromo cavalry, Gurage as well as Taytu Bitul's Yejju Amhara armies. The Ethiopian army at Adwa was, therefore, a mosaic of various ethnic groups and tribes that marched north for a common, national cause.

Developments during Menelik's reign

Relations with Russia

Menelik begun expanding Ethiopia's diplomatic ties, looking to Europe for a major power willing to enter into a relationship with the Ethiopian government. His sights soon settled on Imperial Russia, which proved amenable to Ethiopian attempts to establish a diplomatic relationship. During the visit of a Russian diplomatic and military mission in 1893, Menelik II concluded a Russo-Ethiopian alliance. As a result, from 1893 to 1913, the Russian government sponsored the visits of thousands of advisers and volunteers from Russia to Ethiopia. Among those who were sent were the Russian poets Alexander Bulatovich and Nikolay Gumilyov, both of whom developed close personal ties with Menelik. Russian support for Ethiopia led to the advent of a Russian Red Cross mission as medical support for the Ethiopian military. It arrived in Addis Ababa some three months after Menilek's victory at Adwa, and established the first hospital in Ethiopia.

Abolition of slave trading
By the mid-1890s, Menelik was actively suppressing the slave trade, ordering the destruction of several slave markets throughout the region and punishing slave traders with amputation. Both Tewodros II and Yohannes IV had outlawed slave trading, but as not all tribes were against it and as the country was surrounded on every side by slave raiders and traders, it was not possible even at the dawn of the 20th century to suppress the trade entirely. According to apologists, while Menelik actively enforced his prohibition, it was beyond his power to change the minds of all his people regarding the age-old practice.

Introducing new technology

Menelik II was fascinated by modernity, and like Tewodros II before him, he had a keen ambition to introduce Western technological and administrative advances into Ethiopia. Following the rush by the major powers to establish diplomatic relations following the Ethiopian victory at Adwa, more and more westerners began to travel to Ethiopia looking for trade, farming, hunting, and mineral exploration concessions. Menelik II founded the first modern bank in Ethiopia, the Bank of Abyssinia, introduced the first modern postal system, signed the agreement and initiated work that established the Addis Ababa –Djibouti railway with the French, introduced electricity to Addis Ababa, as well as the telephone, telegraph, the motor car, and modern plumbing. He attempted unsuccessfully to introduce coinage to replace the Maria Theresa thaler.

In 1894, Menelik granted a concession for the building of a railway to his capital from the French port of Djibouti but, alarmed by a claim made by France in 1902 to control of the line in Ethiopian territory, he ordered a stop for four years on the extension of the railway beyond Dire Dawa. In 1906 when France, the United Kingdom, and Italy came to an agreement on the subject, granting control to a joint venture corporation, Menelik officially reaffirmed his full sovereign rights over the whole of his empire.

According to one persistent tale, Menelik heard about the modern method of executing criminals using electric chairs during the 1890s, and ordered 3 for his Kingdom. When the chairs arrived, Menelik learned they would not work, as Ethiopia did not yet have an electric power industry. Rather than waste his investment, Menelik used one of the chairs as his throne, sending another to his second (Lique Mekwas) or Abate Ba-Yalew. Recent research, however, has cast significant doubt on this story, and suggested it was invented by a Canadian journalist during the 1930s.

Personal life and death
Menelik reportedly spoke French, English and Italian fluently. He read many books and was educated in finance, getting involved in various investments, including in American railroads and American securities and French and Belgian mining investments.

Wives

Menelik married three times but he did not have a single legitimate child by any of his wives. However, he is reputed to have fathered several children by women who were not his wives, and he recognized three of those children as being his progeny.

In 1864, Menelik married Woizero Altash Tewodros, whom he divorced in 1865; the marriage produced no children. Altash Tewodros was a daughter of Emperor Tewodros II. She and Menelik were married during the time that Menelik was held captive by Tewodros. The marriage ended when Menelik escaped captivity, abandoning her. She was subsequently remarried to Dejazmatch Bariaw Paulos of Adwa.

In 1865, the same year as divorcing his first wife, Menelik married the much older noblewoman Woizero Bafena Wolde Michael. This marriage was also childless, and they were married for seventeen years before being divorced in 1882. Menelik was very fond of his wife, but she apparently did not have a sincere affection for him. Woizero Befana had several children by previous marriages and was more interested in securing their welfare than in the welfare of her present husband. For many years, she was widely suspected of being secretly in touch with Emperor Yohannes IV in her ambition to replace her husband on the throne of Shewa with one of her sons from a previous marriage. Finally, she was implicated in a plot to overthrow Menelik when he was King of Shewa. With the failure of her plot, Woizero Befana was separated from Menelik, but Menelik apparently was still deeply attached to her. An attempt at reconciliation failed, but when his relatives and courtiers suggested new young wives to the King, he would sadly say "You ask me to look at these women with the same eyes that once gazed upon Befana?", paying tribute both to his ex-wife's beauty and his own continuing attachment to her.

Finally, Menelik divorced his treasonous wife in 1882, and in 1883, he married Taytu Betul. Menelik's new wife had been married four times previously, and he became her fifth husband. They were married in a full communion church service and the marriage was thus fully canonical and indissoluble, which had not been the case with either of Menelik's previous wives. The marriage, which proved childless, would last until his death. Taytu Betul would become Empress consort upon her husband's succession, and would become the most powerful consort of an Ethiopian monarch since Empress Mentewab. She enjoyed considerable influence on Menelik and his court until the end, something which was aided by her own family background. Empress Taytu Betul was a noblewoman of Imperial blood and a member of one of the leading families of the regions of Semien, Yejju in modern Wollo, and Begemder. Her paternal uncle, Dejazmatch Wube Haile Maryam of Semien, had been the ruler of Tigray and much of northern Ethiopia. She and her uncle Ras Wube were two of the most powerful people among descendants of Ras Gugsa Mursa, a ruler of Oromo descent from the house of was Sheik of Wollo. Emperor Yohannes was able to broaden his power base in northern Ethiopia through Taytu's family connections in Begemider, Semien and Yejju; she also served him as his close adviser, and went to the battle of Adwa with 5,000 troops of her own. From 1906, for all intents and purposes, Taytu Betul ruled in Menelik's stead during his infirmity. Menelik II and Taytu Betul personally owned 70,000 slaves. Abba Jifar II also is said to have more than 10,000 slaves and allowed his armies to enslave the captives during a battle with all his neighboring clans. This practice was common between various tribes and clans of Ethiopia for thousands of years.

Taytu arranged political marriages between her Yejju and Semien relatives and key Shewan aristocrates like Ras Woldegyorgis Aboye, who was Governor of Kaffa, Ras Mekonen who was governor of Harar, and Menelik's eldest daughter Zewditu Menelik who became Nigeste Negestat of the empire after the overthrow of Lij Iyasu. Taytu's step daughter, Zewditu, was married to her nephew Ras Gugsa Welle who administered Begemider up to the 1930s.

Natural children

Previous to his marriage to Taytu Betul, Menelik fathered several natural children. Among them, he chose to recognise three specific children (two daughters and one son) as being his progeny. These were:
A daughter, Woizero Shoaregga Menelik, born 1867. She would marry twice and become the mother of:
A son, Abeto Wossen Seged Wodajo, born of the first marriage; never considered for the succession due to dwarfism
A daughter, Woizero Zenebework Mikael, who was married at age twelve and died in childbirth one year later
A son, the purported Emperor Iyasu V. He nominally succeeded upon Menelik's death in 1913, but was never crowned; he was deposed in 1916 by powerful nobles.
A daughter, Woizero (later Empress) Zewditu Menelik, born 1876, died 1930. She married four times and had some children, but none of them survived to adulthood. She was proclaimed Empress in her own right in 1916, but was a figurehead, with ruling power in the hands of regent Ras Tafari Makonnen, who succeeded her in 1930 as Emperor Haile Selassie.
A son, Abeto Asfa Wossen Menelik, born 1873. He died unwed and childless when he was about fifteen years of age.

Menelik's only recognised son, Abeto Asfa Wossen Menelik, died unwed and childless when he was about fifteen years of age, leaving him with only two daughters. The elder daughter, Woizero Shoaregga, was first married to Dejazmatch Wodajo Gobena, the son of Ras Gobena Dachi. They had a son, Abeto Wossen Seged Wodajo, but this grandson of Menelik II was eliminated from the succession due to dwarfism. In 1892, twenty-five-year-old Woizero Shoaregga was married for a second time to forty-two-year-old Ras Mikael of Wollo. They had two children, namely a daughter, Woizero Zenebework Mikael, who would be married at the age of twelve to the much older Ras Bezabih Tekle Haymanot of Gojjam, and would die in childbirth a year later; and a son, Lij Iyasu, who would nominally succeed as Emperor after Menelik's death in 1913, but would never be crowned, and would be deposed by powerful nobles in favour of Menelik's younger daughter Zewditu in 1916.

Menelik's younger daughter, Zewditu Menelik, had a long and chequered life. She was married four times, and eventually became Empress in her own right, the first woman to hold that position in Ethiopia since the Queen of Sheba. She was only ten years old when Menelik got her married to Ras Araya Selassie Yohannes, the fifteen-year-old son of Emperor Yohannes IV, in 1886. In May 1888, Ras Araya Selassie died and Zewditu became a widow at age twelve. She was married two more times for brief periods to Gwangul Zegeye and Wube Atnaf Seged before marrying Gugsa Welle in 1900 CE. Gugsa Welle was the nephew of Empress Taytu Betul, Menelik's third wife. Zewditu had some children, but none of them survived to adulthood. Menelik died in 1913, and his grandson Iyasu claimed the throne on principle of seniority. However, it was suspected that Iyasu was a secret convert to Islam, which was the religion of his paternal ancestors, and having a Muslim on the throne would have grave implications for Ethiopia in future generations. Therefore, Iyasu was never crowned; he was deposed by nobles in 1916, in favour of his aunt, Zewditu. However, Zewditu (aged 40 at that time) had no surviving children (all her children had died young) and the nobles did not want her husband and his family to exercise power and eventually occupy the throne. Therefore, Zewditu's cousin Ras Tafari Makonnen was named both heir to the throne and regent of the empire. Zewditu had ceremonial duties to perform and wielded powers of arbitration and moral influence, but ruling power was vested in the hands of regent Ras Tafari Makonnen, who succeeded her as Emperor Haile Selassie in 1930.

Apart from the three recognised natural children, Menelik was rumoured to be the father of some other children also. These include Ras Birru Wolde Gabriel and Dejazmach Kebede Tessema. The latter, in turn, was later rumoured to be the natural grandfather of Colonel Mengistu Haile Mariam, the communist leader of the Derg, who eventually deposed the monarchy and assumed power in Ethiopia from 1977 to 1991.

Illness, death and succession
On 27 October 1909, Menelik II suffered a massive stroke and his "mind and spirit died". After that, Menelik was no longer able to reign, and the office was taken over by Empress Taytu, as de facto ruler, until Ras Bitwaddad Tesemma was publicly appointed regent. However, he died within a year, and a council of regency – from which the empress was excluded – was formed in March 1910.

In the early morning hours of 12 December 1913, Emperor Menelik II died. He was buried quickly without announcement or ceremony at the Se'el Bet Kidane Meheret Church, on the grounds of the Imperial Palace. In 1916 Menelik II was reburied in the specially built church at Ba'eta Le Mariam Monastery in Addis Ababa.

After the death of Menelik II, the council of regency continued to rule Ethiopia. Lij Iyasu was never crowned Emperor of Ethiopia, and eventually, Empress Zewditu I succeeded Menelik II on 27 September 1916.

Legacy
The Adwa Victory Day is celebrated in March annually, and it would also inspire Pan-African movements around the globe. 

Despite being generally considered the founder of modern Ethiopia, Menelik's legacy also garnered controversies due to the atrocities committed by his army against civilians and combatants during the occupation of territories into his Empire, which are considered by many historians as constituting genocide. According to Awol Allo:

A desire to share in the glamor Menelik enjoyed after his victory over Italy may explain an improbable Serb legend, recounted by English anthropologist Mary E. Durham, portraying Menelik and the Serb king of Montenegro as kinsmen, based on little more than the similarity between the Ethiopian honorific Negus and the name of the Herzegovinian village, Njegushi, from which the Montenegrin royal family originated:When these Herzegovinese migrated to Montenegro, a large body of them went yet farther afield and settled in the mountains of Abyssinia, among them a branch of the family of Petrovich of Njegushi, from which is directly descended Menelik, who preserves the title of Negus and is a distant cousin of Prince Nikola of Montenegro, and to this large admixture of Slav blood the Abyssinians owe their fine stature and their high standard of civilisation, as compared with the neighbouring African tribes. Menelik was featured as the leader of the Ethiopian civilization in the New Frontier season pass of the 4X video game Civilization VI. His ability, Council of Ministers, grants sizeable benefits to cities founded on hills, and units fighting in hills.

Notable quotes

 “Ethiopia has been for fourteen centuries a Christian island in a sea of pagans” - Menelik Letter to European powers
 “This country is mine and no other nation can have it” - Menelik response to Italian protectorate over Ethiopia claim
 “When united, the victory is ours as many small pieces of Bark can conquer an elephant” - Menelik using Tullama's traditional saying
 “There was never a time when united that Ethiopians lost to an enemy in history” - speaking to war messengers

See also
 Ilemi Triangle
 Paul Merab
 1890s African rinderpest epizootic
 First Italo-Ethiopian War

References 
Footnotes

Citations

References
 
 
 
 Chris Prouty. Empress Taytu and Menilek II: Ethiopia 1883–1910. Trenton: The Red Sea Press, 1986. 
 A. K. Bulatovich Ethiopia Through Russian Eyes: Country in Transition, 1896–1898, translated by Richard Seltzer, 2000
 With the Armies of Menelik II, emperor of Ethiopia at www.samizdat.com A.K. Bulatovich With the Armies of Menelik II translated by Richard Seltzer

External links

 Imperial Ethiopia Homepages – Emperor Menelik II the Early Years
 Imperial Ethiopia Homepages – Emperor Menelik II the Later Years
 Ethiopian Treasures – Emperor Menelik II
 'The Emperor's electric chair' – Critical re-examination of a popular legend concerning Menelik II
  (In Amharic, from 4 June 1899; The British Library (search phrase "Menelik II")).
 

1844 births
1913 deaths
19th-century monarchs in Africa
19th-century emperors of Ethiopia
20th-century emperors of Ethiopia
People from Amhara Region
Rulers of Shewa
Genocide perpetrators
Solomonic dynasty
Honorary Knights Grand Cross of the Order of the Bath
Honorary Knights Grand Cross of the Order of St Michael and St George
Ethiopian Oriental Orthodox Christians
Ethiopian Orthodox Christians
People of the First Italo-Ethiopian War
Grand Crosses of the Order of Saint Stephen of Hungary
City founders